Vladimir Konstantinov is former professional ice hockey defenceman from Russia

Vladimir Konstantinov may also refer to 

 Vladimir K. Konstantinov, a Russian actor who appeared in The New Gulliver
 Vladimir Konstantinov (politician), a Crimean politician